Actinopus candango is a species of mygalomorph spider in the family Actinopodidae. It is endemic to Brazil and is known from the Federal District and Goiás, in the Central-West Region of the country. The specific name candango is a Portuguese word describing the builders of the city of Brasília, the type locality.

The holotype, a male, measures  in total length, where a paratype female measures .

References 

candango
Spiders of Brazil
Endemic fauna of Brazil
Spiders described in 2020